Synaptotagmin-like 2, also known as SYTL2, is a human gene.

Function 

The protein encoded by this gene is a synaptotagmin-like protein (SLP) that belongs to a C2 domain-containing protein family. The SLP homology domain (SHD) of this protein has been shown to specifically bind the GTP-bound form of Ras-related protein Rab-27A (RAB27A), which suggests a role in vesicle trafficking. Multiple alternatively spiced transcript variants encoding distinct isoforms have been observed.

Interactions 

SYTL2 has been shown to interact with RAB27A.

References

Further reading